
Year 368 BC was a year of the pre-Julian Roman calendar. At the time, it was known as the Year of the Tribunate of Cornelius, Praetextatus, Structus, Capitolinus, Crassus and Cicurinus (or, less frequently, year 386 Ab urbe condita). The denomination 368 BC for this year has been used since the early medieval period, when the Anno Domini calendar era became the prevalent method in Europe for naming years.

Events 
 By place 
 Greece 
 While the previous year's intervention by the Macedonians in Thessaly is successful, after the Macedonian troops withdraw, Alexander of Pherae treats his subjects as cruelly as before. So the Thessalians seek Thebes' support. Pelopidas is sent to their assistance, but is treacherously seized and imprisoned.
 In response, Epaminondas is reinstated in command of Theban troops and leads the Theban army into Thessaly, where he outmanoeuvres the Thessalians and secures the release of Pelopidas without a fight.
 At the instigation of Alexander's brother-in-law, Ptolemy of Aloros, Alexander II of Macedon is assassinated during a festival. Although Alexander's brother, Perdiccas III becomes the next king, he is under age, and Ptolemy is appointed regent.

 China 
 Zhou Xian Wang becomes King of the Zhou Dynasty of China.

 By topic 
 Philosophy 
 Plato's Republic is completed. It lays down the rules for an ideal, righteous society and suggests that kings ought to be philosophers (or at least taught by philosophers).

Births

Deaths 
 Alexander II, King of Macedonia (assassinated)

References